The Plot Thickens may refer to:

The Plot Thickens (film), a 1936 mystery film
The Plot Thickens, alternate title of the 1935 film Here Comes Cookie, starring George Burns
The Plot Thickens (The Jonbenet album), 2005
The Plot Thickens (Galliano album), 1994